Herbert Gunter Grubel (born February 26, 1934) is a Canadian professor, economist, writer, and former politician. He represented the electoral district of Capilano—Howe Sound in the House of Commons of Canada from 1993 to 1997. Grubel was born in Frankfurt, Germany.

As a member of the Reform Party, Grubel defeated former federal cabinet minister Mary Collins in the 1993 election, pushing her into third place. He served as the party's finance critic from 1995 to 1997, and was controversial for his outspoken support of Canada moving toward a flat tax system.

Grubel did not run in the 1997 election. As of 2011 he is professor emeritus of economics at Simon Fraser University and senior fellow of the Fraser Institute. He has also worked at the economic faculties of Yale, Stanford, the University of Chicago and the University of Pennsylvania.

Grubel has published 27 books and more than 130 professional articles in economics, dealing with international trade and finance and a wide range of economic policy issues. One of his most important contributions to international economics is the Grubel–Lloyd index, which measures intra-industry trade of a particular product. While at the Fraser Institute Herbert published a paper titled: "The Case for the Amero: The Economics and Politics of a North American Monetary Union", in which he proposed that Canada and the USA adopt a shared currency called the 'amero'.

References

External links 
 Herbert Grubel
 

1934 births
German emigrants to Canada
Living people
Members of the House of Commons of Canada from British Columbia
Hessian emigrants to the United States
Reform Party of Canada MPs